Ron de Roode (20 March 1965 – 29 August 2022) was a Dutch footballer who played as a winger.

Playing career

Club
Born in Leiden, de Roode started his career at local amateur side Roodenburg and joined FC Den Haag in 1982. He became an instant hit with the fans, due to his speed, dribbling skills and his deadly crosses and goals. Den Haag won the  1985–86 Eerste Divisie title undefeated with de Roode scoring 16 goals in that season. He totalled 53 goals in 177 league games for the club, as well as 8 goals in 23 domestic cup matches and 1 goal in 4 Cup Winners' Cup matches.

In 1989, de Roode moved to Willem II, but did not become a regular starter for the club. He played a total of 32 league matches for them, scoring 6 goals.

He joined Eerste Divisie outfit Telstar in late 1990, scoring 41 goals in 98 matches in all competitions for them. While playing for Telstar, he was diagnosed with testicular cancer which effectively ended his professional career.

International
De Roode earned three caps for the Netherlands U17 national team in 1981.

Managerial career
After retiring as a player, de Roode coached at amateur sides LFC, Stompwijk’92, UVS and DoCoS.

References

1965 births
2022 deaths
Dutch footballers
Footballers from Leiden
Association football wingers
Netherlands youth international footballers
Eredivisie players
Eerste Divisie players
ADO Den Haag players
Willem II (football club) players
SC Telstar players
20th-century Dutch people
21st-century Dutch people